Estevan/Bryant Airport  was located  north-west of Estevan, Saskatchewan, Canada.

See also 
 List of airports in Saskatchewan
 Estevan Regional Aerodrome
 Estevan (South) Airport
 Estevan (Blue Sky) Aerodrome
 List of defunct airports in Canada

References 

Defunct airports in Saskatchewan
Benson No. 35, Saskatchewan
Transport in Estevan